Shady Brook is an unincorporated community in Dickinson County, Kansas, United States.

History
Shady Brook (spelled historically Shadybrook) had a post office from 1901 until 1907.

References

Further reading

External links
 Dickinson County maps: Current, Historic, KDOT

Unincorporated communities in Dickinson County, Kansas
Unincorporated communities in Kansas